The Rocketeer & The Spirit: Pulp Friction was a limited series of crossover comics featuring The Rocketeer and The Spirit published between 2013 and 2014.  The four-issue series was published jointly by IDW Publishing, which owned the license to The Rocketeer, and DC Comics, which owned the license to The Spirit.

The stories were written by Mark Waid and the artwork was created by Paul Smith and J. Bone.

References

IDW Publishing titles
2013 comics debuts